Baroon is a village in Lower Dir district of Pakistan, situated at a distance of about 11 km from Timergara, on the way from Timergara to Upper Dir, opposite to the main road, separated from the main road by Panjkora river.  The village contains many beautiful fields in which different crops are sown like rice, wheat, maize, different vegetables, however the massive flooding in 2010 and 2022 badly affected the fields. Although most of the fruits gardens were swept away by the severe flood, still some fruits like Persimmon and Orange can be seen at some spots in the village.

Location  
Baroon is a beautiful village situated on the northern bank of river Panjkora, opposite to Rani village.

History 
Three major tribes of QAZI(قاضی) Shinwari (شینواری) and Yousafzai(mekhail) are settled here as well as three families of Afridi (Adam Khel) are also settled. All the three tribes have a long history of living here and Afridi tribe arrived in the village almost two centuries ago. Malak abdul Hanan Yousafzai was the ruler of Baroon

Population  
The exact population of Baroon is not known, however the village consists of more than 800 houses.

Climate  
Like other parts of the district DIR LOWER, the village observe four seasons in a year i.e., Winter, Spring, Summer and Autumn. The seasons of spring and autumn are quite shorter as compared to long Summer and Winter. Due to climate change and global warming, the duration of winter has been reduced to two months, i.e., December and January but still the weather is much better as compared to city timergara.

Education  
Baroon has a primary and a middle school for boys and also for girls. A private school "IEMS School Baroon" has also been found. The education rate is increasing with the passage of time. Students from this village get their higher education in big cities of Pakistan. They are studying in Peshawar, Islamabad and other cities. Some students from Baroon are studying abroad as well, There are numbers of passionate student of Computer Science who has done Bachelors in Computer Science but Abuzar Khan Afridi is the only person from this village who completed his Bachelor of Software Engineering recently.

Sports  
The most famous games played here are football, volleyball and cricket. Each year, in The Month of Ramadan a night sports gala is arranged in which cricket and football are played. Nowadays a cricket league "Baroon Super League, BSL" is in being played while there are many small leagues like (BBL) played these leagues are mostly organized by Waqar Yousafzai,

Health facilities 
Currently, there is no notable health facility available in the village only few numbers of medical stores are available i-e Khayam Medical Store. In case of emergency or minor disease state, nearest health hospital is DHQ hospital, Timergara. In case of major issues, the patients are referred to Divisional Headquarter Hospital Saidu or Lady Reading Hospital Peshawar.

Villages nearby 
In the west, Munjai and Pindikas, In the east are Sacha Maira and Khal, In the South east is Rabat and South west is Rani, which is adjacent to the village Danwah on the main Timergara-Dir road.

Populated places in Lower Dir District